Achelia is a genus of pycnogonids in the family Ammotheidae.

Species 
The following are the species comprising the genus Achelia.
  Achelia adelpha  Child, 1970
  Achelia alaskensis  (Cole, 1904)
  Achelia anomala  Arnaud, 1974
  Achelia armata  Bouvier, 1916
  Achelia aspera  Loman, 1923
  Achelia assimilis  (Haswell, 1885)
  Achelia australiensis  Stock, 1954
  Achelia barnardi  Stock, 1959
  Achelia besnardi  Sawaya, 1951
  Achelia bituberculata  Hedgpeth, 1949
  Achelia borealis  (Schimkewitsch, 1895)
  Achelia boschi  Stock, 1992
  Achelia brevicauda  (Loman, 1904)
  Achelia brevirostris  Losina-Losinsky, 1961
  Achelia bullosa  Child, 1996
  Achelia chelata  (Hilton, 1939)
  Achelia columnaris  Stock, 1992
  Achelia communis  (Bouvier, 1906)
  Achelia crurispinifera  Kim & Kim, 1985
  Achelia cuneatis  Child, 1999
  Achelia curticauda  Nakamura, Miyazaki & Child, 1996
  Achelia deodata  Muller, 1990
  Achelia discoidea  Exline, 1936
  Achelia dohrni  (Thompson, 1884)
  Achelia echinata  Hodge, 1864
  Achelia euryfrontalis  Turpaeva, 2000
  Achelia fernandeziana  (Loman, 1920)
  Achelia germanica  (Hodgson, 1915)
  Achelia gracilipes  (Cole, 1904)
  Achelia gracilis  Verrill, 1900
  Achelia hariettae  Marcus, 1940
  Achelia hispida  Hodge, 1864
  Achelia hoekii  (Pfeffer, 1889)
  Achelia japonica  Ortmann, 1890
  Achelia kiiensis  Utinomi, 1951
  Achelia kurilensis  Losina-Losinsky, 1961
  Achelia laevis  Hodge, 1864
  Achelia lagena  Child, 1994
  Achelia lagenaria  Stock, 1992
  Achelia langi  (Dohrn, 1881)
  Achelia latifrons  (Cole, 1904)
  Achelia megacephala  Hodgson, 1915
  Achelia megova  (Hilton, 1943)
  Achelia mixta  Stock, 1994
  Achelia nana  (Loman, 1908)
  Achelia neotenica  Krapp, 1986
  Achelia orientalis  Schimkewitsch, 1913
  Achelia orpax  Nakamura & Child, 1983
  Achelia ovosetosa  (Hilton, 1942)
  Achelia parvula  (Loman, 1923)
  Achelia pribilofensis  (Cole, 1904)
  Achelia quadridentata  (Hodgson, 1910)
  Achelia rostrata  Turpaeva, 2000
  Achelia salebrosa  Losina-Losinsky, 1961
  Achelia sawayai  Marcus, 1940
  Achelia scabra  Wilson, 1880
  Achelia segmentata  Utinomi, 1954
  Achelia serratipalpis  (Bouvier, 1911)
  Achelia setulosa  (Loman, 1912)
  Achelia shepherdi  Stock, 1973
  Achelia simplex  (Giltay, 1934)
  Achelia simplissima  (Hilton, 1939)
  Achelia socors  (Loman, 1908)
  Achelia spatula  Nakamura & Child, 1983
  Achelia spicata  (Hodgson, 1915)
  Achelia spinosa  (Stimpson, 1853)
  Achelia spinoseta  (Hilton, 1939)
  Achelia sufflata  Gordon, 1944
  Achelia superba  (Loman, 1911)
  Achelia tenuipes  Stock, 1990
  Achelia transfuga  Stock, 1954
  Achelia transfugoides  Stock, 1973
  Achelia turba  Stock, 1990
  Achelia vulgaris  (Costa, 1861)
  Achelia watamu  (Müller, 1990)

References

External links 

 National Center for Biotechnololy Information (NCBI): Achelia Taxonomy ID: 61894
 Catalogue of life: Registros por Achelia

Pycnogonids